Roger D'Astous (March 3, 1926 in Montreal, Quebec – April 5, 1998 in Montreal, Quebec) was a Canadian architect.

Early life
Roger D'Astous was the second child of a family of four children. His father (René D'Astous) worked at the local newspaper, and his mother (Corine Basilières) gave him his artistic inspirations.

Studies
He began, six years later, an architect degree at the École of fine arts in Montreal. After graduating in 1952, he joined the Taliesin Fellowship, where he completed a one-year internship (from August 1952 to July 1953) under the direction of American architect Frank Lloyd Wright in Wisconsin and Arizona, thus becoming the first Quebecer architect to become an apprentice to Wright.

Awards
He was recognized with a number of awards during his long career: the Montreal Chamber of Commerce presented him with a Habitas certificate of excellence in 1967 for his achievements in housing design, while in 1987, Roger D'Astous received two awards: the Canadian Wood Council bestowed an award for the Gélinas house and the award of excellence from the Ordre des architectes du Québec. In 1990, the architect was honored with the award of excellence from the Royal Architectural Institute of Canada (RAIC). In a posthumous event, thirteen years after his death Roger D'Astous was awarded "Grand Artisan" in 2011 from the Minister of Culture and Communications of Quebec, recognizing him as a great contributor to Quebec's cultural scene in the last fifty years.

Archives
The Canadian Centre for Architecture archives contains 4,100 drawings, 2,581 photographic materials, 66 publications, 12 notebooks, 7 models, 5 artefacts, and 1.23 meters of textual records from some of his 182 projects which include residential housing, churches and religious buildings, World's fair pavilions, government buildings, commercial buildings, etc.

Book
Specialized in the study of contemporary Quebec architecture, Claude Bergeron, a retired professor from Laval University, wrote in 2001 a comprehensive book ("Roger D'Astous Architecte", 234 pages) about the architect's entire professional accomplishments. The book was published by Les Presses de l'Université de Laval.

Documentary
Montreal filmmaker Étienne Desrosiers produced in 2016 an extended documentary "Roger D'Astous", 104 minutes long, that covers the complete lifespan of the architect. Through his clients and collaborators and by making witty uses of unseen archives, the documentary is a journey through one modernist architecture giant. The film is distributed in Canada by K-Films Amérique (DVD, VOD).

References

External links
 Finding aid for the Roger D'Astous fonds, Canadian Centre for Architecture (digitized items)

Canadian architects
1926 births
1998 deaths
French Quebecers
Architects from Montreal
École des beaux-arts de Montréal alumni